Solidarity ((Portuguese: Solidariedade) is a Brazilian social-democratic political party that uses the TSE number 77. The party elected 13 deputies and one senator in the 2018 Brazilian general election.

In the 2022 Brazilian general election, Solidarity supported the pre-candidacy of Lula da Silva in the 2022 Brazilian general election under the alliance Let's go together for Brazil. It remains allied with the Workers Party & other coalition members.

Following the elections, the party announced plans to merge with the Republican Party of the Social Order.

Ideology 

The party identifies itself as centre-left and social-democratic. The party has strong links with Força Sindical, a labour union that historically strongly opposes the hegemony of Central Única dos Trabalhadores and other leftist labour movements in favor of a less ideological and more pragmatic approach, "Sindicalismo de Resultados" (Unionism of Results), which means less ideology and more direct gains for the working class.

The party supports a world-view following social constructionism and social constructivism.

Electoral history

Presidential elections

Legislative elections

See also 
:Category:Solidariedade politicians

References

2012 establishments in Brazil
Centrist parties
Political parties established in 2012
Social democratic parties in Brazil